The West Bengal Legislative Assembly election, 1967 was held in Indian state of West Bengal in 1967 to elect 280 members to the West Bengal Legislative Assembly. United Front led by Ajoy Mukherjee won majority of seats in the election, and formed first non-Congress government of the state.

Results

|-
!colspan=2|Party
!Candidates
!Seats
!Votes
!Vote%
!Seat change
|-
| 
|align="left"|Indian National Congress||280||127||5,207,930||41.13%|| 30
|-
| 
|align="left"|Communist Party of India (Marxist)||135||43||2,293,026||18.11%|| 43
|-
| 
|align="left"|Bangla Congress||80||34||1,286,028||10.16%|| 34
|-
| 
|align="left"|Communist Party of India||62||16||827,196||6.53%|| 34
|-
| 
|align="left"|All India Forward Bloc||42||13||561,148||4.43%||
|-
|
|align="left"|Samyukta Socialist Party||26||7||269,234||2.13%|| 7
|-
| 
|align="left"|Praja Socialist Party||26||7||238,694||1.88%|| 2
|-
| 
|align="left"|Revolutionary Socialist Party||16||6||238,694||2.14%|| 2
|-
| 
|align="left"|Socialist Unity Centre of India||8||4||238,694||0.72%|| 1
|-
| 
|align="left"|Marxist Forward Bloc||58||1||167,934||1.33%|| 1
|-
| 
|align="left"|Revolutionary Communist Party of India||58||1||167,934||1.33%|| 8
|-
| 
|align="left"|Bharatiya Jana Sangh||58||1||167,934||1.33%|| 1
|-
| 
|align="left"|Swatantra Party||21||1||102,576||0.81%|| 1
|-
| 
|align="left"|Independents||327||31||1,708,011||13.49%|| 20
|-
!colspan=2|Total
|1058
|280
|12,663,030
|
|
|-
|}

Elected members

Post-Poll Alliance
United Front led by Ajoy Mukherjee formed the Government. United Front was combination of People's United Left Front, an electoral combination of Communist Party of India, the Bangla Congress, the All India Forward Bloc and the Bolshevik Party of India with United Left Front (1967),  electoral alliance of The front comprised the Communist Party of India (Marxist), the Samyukta Socialist Party, the Socialist Unity Centre of India, the Marxist Forward Bloc, the Revolutionary Communist Party of India, the Workers Party of India and the Revolutionary Socialist Party.

References

State Assembly elections in West Bengal
1960s in West Bengal
West Bengal